Don't delete this article because this actor/actress will play a main role in the upcoming series Kamen Rider Ex-Aid, and will be active and notable later on.

 is a Japanese actor.

Biography
Matsumoto was chosen as one of Top Coat's 20th Anniversary Audition artists on 2014.

His acting debut was in the tokusatsu series Ultraman X on 2015.

On 2016, Matsumoto appeared in another tokusatsu series Kamen Rider Ex-Aid as Taiga Hanaya/Kamen Rider Snipe.

Filmography

TV series

Films

Web series

Original video series

Stage

References

External links
Official profile 

1994 births
Living people
Actors from Fukuoka Prefecture
21st-century Japanese male actors